Matan (lit. Gift) is a community settlement in central Israel. Located near Yarhiv and Nirit, it falls under the jurisdiction of Drom HaSharon Regional Council.

History
The village was founded in 1993, and took its name from the Bible, specifically Proverbs 18:16:
A man's gift maketh room for him, and bringeth him before great men.

Its establishment was part of Minister of Housing Ariel Sharon's 'seven stars' plan to increase Jewish settlement along the Green Line.

Notable residents
Yuval Diskin

References

External links
Official website 

Community settlements
Populated places established in 1995
Populated places in Central District (Israel)
1995 establishments in Israel